The following is a list of unproduced Michael Bay projects in roughly chronological order. During his career, American film director and producer Michael Bay has worked on a number of projects which never progressed beyond the pre-production stage under his direction. Some of these projects fell in "development hell" or are officially canceled.

1990s

Superman Lives 
Bay was reportedly among many directors who were sought after to replace Tim Burton as director of Superman Lives, but he turned down the offer.

2000s

I Am Legend

Do Not Go Gentle 
In August 2003, Bay was attached to direct the Revolution Studios adventure drama Do Not Go Gentle, about a scientist at the Smithsonian who realizes his lifelong dream of space travel. Neil Tolkin was set to rewrite the script, which was originally written in 1995 by David and Peter Griffiths. The project had previously been set up at Warner Bros., with Sean Connery attached to star and Rob Cohen attached to direct. In December 2003, it was announced that Robert Schenkkan would rewrite the script. There have been no further announcements since.

The Changeling remake 
In October 2006, a remake of The Changeling was announced as a co-production between film companies Rogue Pictures and Platinum Dunes. There have been no further announcements since.

Near Dark remake 
In October 2006, a remake of Near Dark was announced as a co-production between film companies Rogue Pictures and Platinum Dunes. In December 2008, Platinum Dunes producer Bradley Fuller stated that the project had been put on hold due to similarities in conception with Twilight, a film which also contained a romance between human and vampire characters.

Fiasco Heights film 
On 8 April 2007, Bay, Chris Bender and JC Spink will produce the thriller Fiasco Heights, from a script by Kyle Ward through Platinum Dunes. There have been no further announcements since.

2012: The War for Souls film 
On 27 July 2007, Bay will direct Warner Bros' film adaptation of Whitley Strieber's 2012: The War for Souls, from a script by Alex Kurtzman and Roberto Orci. There have been no further announcements since.

The Birds remake 
In 2008, Bay will produce a remake of The Birds through Platinum Dunes with Scott Derrickson writing and directing the movie with Naomi Watts as Melanie Daniels for Universal Pictures. In 2009, Martin Campbell was set to direct from a script by Billy Ray and Peter Craig, Watts left the project and Dennis Illiades taking over when Campbell directed Green Lantern. On 28 February 2014, Diederik Van Rooijen was set to direct the remake, with Jonathan Herman writing the script. However, the movie was revived as a BBC miniseries without Platinum Dunes.

Early development of Bad Boys for Life

Early development of 2009’s Friday the 13th sequel

The Butcherhouse Chronicles film 
On 6 October 2009, Bay will produce Stephen Susco's thriller The Butcherhouse Chronicles, through Platinum Dunes. There have been no further announcements since.

Property of the State film 
On 6 October 2009, Bay will produce Howard Franklin's crime drama Property of the State, through Platinum Dunes. There have been no further announcements since.

2010s

Existence 2.0 film 
On 16 March 2010, Bay was set to produce the adaptation of Nick Spencer and illustrator Ronald Salas’ comic book series Existence 2.0 through his Platinum Dunes company with Miles Millar and Alfred Gough will write the screenplay and Paramount Pictures distributing the movie. There have been no further announcements since.

The Monster Squad remake 
On 18 March 2010, Bay and Platinum Dunes will produce a remake of Fred Dekker's monster comedy film The Monster Squad from a script by Mark Gunn & Brian Gunn and Rob Cohen set to direct the film for Paramount Pictures. In 2014, Platinum Dunes producers Brad Fuller and Andrew Form confirmed that the remake was no longer happening.

Heatseekers film 
On 27 April 2010, Bay and Platinum Dunes will produce former attorney George Mahaffey's screenplay Heatseekers, an action film about a young ex-military pilot who infiltrates a gang of aerial "pirates" working out of Bangkok and takes part in an elaborate tower heist using powered gliders and parachutes for Paramount Pictures. On 15 January 2013, Timur Bekmambetov was set to direct and F. Scott Frazier will rewrite the script. There have been no further announcements since.

Gideon's Sword film 
On 24 May 2010, Bay and Platinum Dunes will produce the film adaptation of Douglas Preston and Lincoln Child's novel Gideon's Sword for Paramount. On 28 September 2010, Chap Taylor was hired to write the script. There have been no further announcements since.

Confidential Alien film 
On 27 July 2010, Bay will produce the sci-fi film Confidential Alien Project, through Platinum Dunes with Bobby Glickert writing and directing the film for Paramount Pictures. There have been no further announcements since.

I Am Number Four sequel (aka The Power of Six) 
In February 2011, screenwriter Marti Noxon told Collider.com that plans for an imminent I Am Number Four sequel were shelved due to the disappointing performance of the first installment at the box office.

In 2013, director D. J. Caruso was asked if there are any possibilities that The Power of Six will get a movie adaption, he replied: "There's been some talk in the past couple of months about trying to do something because there is this audience appetite out there [...]. Most of the people on Twitter that contact me from all over the world ask, "Where's the next movie?" I think DreamWorks is getting those too so it'll be interesting. I don't know if I'd be involved, but I know they're talking about it."

Untitled Taylor Lautner film 
On 16 February 2011, Bay and Platinum Dunes were talking with Taylor Lautner to develop a movie for Lautner to star with a script from Jason Hall. There have been no further announcements since.

Inherit the Earth film 
On 22 February 2011, Bay will produce the sci-fi film Inherit the Earth, through Platinum Dunes with JT Petty writing the film for Columbia Pictures. On 8 January 2015, Andrew Adamson is set to direct Inherit the Earth, with Oren Uzeil writing the script. On 7 December 2016, Mike Flanagan replaced Adamson as director and write a new script. On 21 August 2018, Kornél Mundruczó replaced Flanagan as director with his wife Kata Wéber writing a new script and without Platinum Dunes' involvement.

Untitled Miami drug-trafficking project (aka Cocaine Cowboys) 
On 20 March 2011, HBO ordered Michelle Ashford's series Cocaine Cowboys; inspired by Billy Corben's 2006 documentary Cocaine Cowboys and will be executive-produced by Ashford, Bay, and Jerry Bruckheimer. On 18 September 2014, TNT took the project. Michael Stahl-David, Elizabeth Perkins, Kristen Hager, Kelsey Siepser, Adria Arjona, and Óscar Jaenada were cast as the leads. On 26 March 2015, TNT ordered the pilot to be redeveloped.

The Hauntrepreneur film 
On 27 May 2011, Bay and Platinum Dunes will produce Scott Rosenberg's family fantasy script The Hauntrepreneur, about a family hires a peculiar man, the Hauntrepreneur, to help them adjust to a new town for Paramount Pictures. On 25 January 2012, Russell Brand was set to play the hauntrepreneur. There have been no further announcements since.

Outsiders series
On 20 October 2011, Bay's Platinum Dunes, Adam Glass, and CBS Television Studios were producing Glass' drama Outsiders, for The CW.

Lockdown At Franklin High/Lockdown film 
On 9 March 2012, Bay and Benderspink will co-produce Greg Bishop and Joe Ballarini's script Lockdown At Franklin High, about a monster attacking a high school for Columbia Pictures. On 4 November 2013, animatics supervisor/lead storyboard artist Federico D’Alessandro was set to direct and rewrite the script. On 6 March 2015, Project Almanac writers Andrew Deutschman and Jason Pagan will rewrite the script to be a school shooting and D’Alessandro will not direct the movie. There have been no further announcements since.

The Rising film 
On 12 July 2012, Bay will produce Soo Hugh's low-budget techno-thriller The Rising through Platinum Dunes for Paramount. There have been no further announcements since.

Occult pilot 
On 11 September 2012, A&E ordered James Wong's supernatural crime drama Occult, which will be executive-produced by Bay through Platinum Dunes. Josh Lucas, Lynn Collins, Agnes Bruckner, Daniel Henney and Brennan Brown were cast as the leads. On 11 September 2013, A&E cancelled the project.

The Governess film 
On 7 January 2013, Bay and Platinum Dunes will produce The Governess, from Hanna screenwriter Seth Lockhead for Warner Bros. There have been no further announcements since.

Tom Clancy's Ghost Recon film 
On 11 June 2013, Warner Bros and Platinum Dunes will be making the film and Michael Bay will produce and possibly direct the film, written by Matthew Federman and Stephen Scaia.

Raindrop film 
On 4 September 2013, Bay will produce Jason Pagan and Andrew Stark's handheld-camera thriller Raindrop through Platinum Dunes for Paramount. There have been no further announcements since.

Sabotage film 
On 10 October 2013, Bay and Platinum Dunes will produce the film adaptation of Neal Bascomb's novel Sabotage, an action thriller about a scientist who exposes the Nazi's secret nuclear program. There have been no further announcements since.

Untitled underwater adventure film 
On 17 March 2014, Bay will produce and possibly direct Tom Wheeler and Robbie Thompson's underwater adventure film through Platinum Dunes along with Wheeler. There have been no further announcements since.

Cancelled Teenage Mutant Ninja Turtles: Out of the Shadows sequel 
On August 16, 2014, Noel Fisher stated in an interview that he and the other Turtle actors have signed on for three more films. Megan Fox has also signed on for three films. On May 20, 2016, Tyler Perry said that if a third film is to be made, his character, Baxter Stockman, would probably mutate into his fly form during the movie. Pete Ploszek has also expressed his interests in reprising his role in a third film as Leonardo. On October 29, 2016, producer Andrew Form indicated that no plans were underway for a third film, likely due to the second film's lower box office returns.

Cosmic Motors film 
On 29 August 2014, Bay and Warner Bros will produce Cosmic Motors film, based on Daniel Simon's concept art book from a script by Kyle Ward. There have been no further announcements since.

Time Salvager film 
In June 2015, Bay will direct the film adaptation of Wesley Chu's first Time Salvager book with Lorenzo di Bonaventura and Mark Vahradian producing. On 18 September 2017, Zak Olkewicz was hired to write the script. There have been no further announcements since.

Team Rwanda Cycling film 
On 4 June 2015, Bay and Leonardo DiCaprio will produce Orlando von Einsiedel's Team Rwanda Cycling film. There have been no further announcements since.

Drone Warrior biopic 
On 12 May 2016, Bay will produce a film based on Brett Velicovich's memoir Drone Warrior, for Paramount Pictures. On 24 May 2017, Andy Bellin was hired to write the script. There have been no further announcements since.

Northeast Kingdom film 
On 24 October 2016, Bay will produce Alex R. Johnson's revenge thriller Northeast Kingdom, with Johnson directing. There have been no further announcements since.

The Reckoning film 
On 25 October 2016, Bay will produce Patrick Melton and Marcus Dunstan's untitled thriller through Platinum Dunes, with Michael Chaves directing. There have been no further announcements since.

Abandoned The Rock sequel 
In June 2017, director Michael Bay discussed his idea for a follow-up to The Rock that never developed past the concept that Mason is chased by the government after escaping.

Duke Nukem film 
On 22 January 2018, Bay will produce the Duke Nukem movie through Platinum Dunes with John Cena in talks to play Duke, in the vein of Deadpool, and is looking for a director and writer. On 10 June 2022, Legendary Pictures will produce the Duke Nukem movie with Josh Hearld, Jon Hurwitz and Hayden Schlossberg’s Counterbalance Entertainment instead of Bay and Cena.

Lobo film 
In February 2018, DC Films is eyeing Michael Bay to direct the film inspired by the success of Tim Miller's Deadpool film, but only if Bay agrees to direct under the right budget that's below $200 Million. There have been no further announcements since.

Robopocalypse film 
On March 7, 2018, Bay signed on to replace Steven Spielberg as the director of the Robopocalypse film adaptation.

Life on Mars film 
On 11 April 2018, Bay signed on to produce the adaptation of Cecil Castellucci's short story We Have Always Lived on Mars, which is retitled Life on Mars, with John Krasinski directing and producing the movie.

I Am Yours film 
On 13 June 2018, Bay will co-produce Ryan Belenzon and Jeffrey Gelber's thriller I Am Yours, along with Tyler Perry. There have been no further announcements since.

Happy Anniversary film 
On 19 September 2018, Bay will produce Holly Brix's home invasion script Happy Anniversary, through Platinum Dunes. There have been no further announcements since.

Transformers: The Last Knight sequel 
On February 16, 2018, Senior designer of the brand John Warder confirmed Hasbro's plans for a sequel to Transformers: The Last Knight had been postponed and on May 23, Paramount removed the sequel from their release schedule. In an interview with Slash Film on December 10, 2018, producer Lorenzo Di Bonaventura announced that there will continue to be further films in the series following the release of Bumblebee, acknowledging that the franchise will make some changes in their tone and style.

In a March 2019 interview, while promoting Bumblebee in Japan, Di Bonaventura confirmed that sequels to both the solo movie and The Last Knight were in development. He said "One is the latest in the main family series following Transformers: The Last Knight and the other is a sequel to Bumblebee". But one month later, it was confirmed that a direct sequel to The Last Knight is no longer in development.

References 

Unrealized
Bay, Michael